Sardinia is an unincorporated community in Jackson Township, Decatur County, Indiana.

History
Sardinia was laid out in 1865. It was likely named after the island of Sardinia.

Geography

References

Unincorporated communities in Decatur County, Indiana
Unincorporated communities in Indiana